The 2016 Club Season started in July 2016 and went through until September 2016. Competitions are held for open women’s and open men’s teams. There is also a schools competition. The winner of the men's and women's competition qualifies for the National Club championship.

Results

Men's open

3rd/4th play off

Final

Women's open

Schools competition
New South Wales Handball runs the Schools’ Championships for NSW schools. In 2015, the Championships will be contested in two divisions, the Open division for players 15+ (born ’00 or earlier) and the Youth division for players aged 11-14 (born ’01-’04), with male and female categories for each. The tournament will be held at a venue in the Sydney metropolitan area over four days (one day for each category).  Results to follow.

References

 Men's results - NSWHB
 Women's results - NSWHB
 Sydney Uni NSW Champs. NSW Handball webpage

Handball competitions in Australia
2016 in Australian sport
2016–17 domestic handball leagues